The Dr. Sam G. Daniel House is a historic house on the north side of Nome Street, one block west of the courthouse in Marshall, Arkansas.  It is a two-story wood-frame structure, with a hip roof and clapboard siding.  It has a projecting gabled section at the left of its front facade, and a polygonal turreted section on the right side, with a single-story porch in front.  The house was built in 1902-03 for Dr. Sam Daniel.

The house was listed on the National Register of Historic Places in 1993.

See also
National Register of Historic Places listings in Searcy County, Arkansas

References

Houses on the National Register of Historic Places in Arkansas
Queen Anne architecture in Arkansas
Houses completed in 1902
Houses in Searcy County, Arkansas
National Register of Historic Places in Searcy County, Arkansas